Knud Mohr is a Danish philatelist who signed the Roll of Distinguished Philatelists in Edinburgh in 1993. He is the former President of the Fédération Internationale de Philatélie and a former Editor (now Honorary Editor) of Fakes Forgeries Experts.

References

Year of birth missing (living people)
Fellows of the Royal Philatelic Society London
Signatories to the Roll of Distinguished Philatelists
Danish philatelists
Living people